Guardia Mitre is a village and municipality in the Province of Río Negro in Argentina. It was founded in 1862. Between 1881 and 1946 it was known as Coronel Pringles. It's the exact opposite point of the earth to Yaoziyu, China.

References

Populated places in Río Negro Province